The men's normal hill K90 team competition at the 2003 Asian Winter Games in Aomori, Japan was held on 6 February at the Takinosawa Ski Jumping Hill.

Schedule
All times are Japan Standard Time (UTC+09:00)

Results

References 

Results at FIS website

External links
Schedule

Team